Warren "Rennie" Simmons (born February 25, 1942) is an American former football coach. Simmons last coached for the Washington Redskins as tight ends coach. Simmons announced his retirement from the Redskins on January 7, 2009, after 34 years as a coach. 27 of those seasons were in the NFL, and 18 of them were with the Redskins.

References

External links
 Washington Redskins Coaching Staff

1942 births
Living people
Atlanta Falcons coaches
Cerritos Falcons football players
Houston Oilers coaches
Los Angeles Rams coaches
Washington Redskins coaches
Cal State Fullerton Titans football coaches
San Diego State Aztecs football players
Vanderbilt Commodores football coaches
Sportspeople from Poughkeepsie, New York